U-Jaama (Unite) is a live album by jazz saxophonist Archie Shepp recorded at Massy in 1975 and released on the French Uniteledis label as a double LP.

Track listing
All compositions by Archie Shepp except as indicated
 "Blues For Don'l Duck" - 29:20
 "U-Jaama (Unité)" - 13:50
 "Hipnosis" - 18:00
 "African Drum Suite" - 16:00
 "52nd Street Theme" (Thelonious Monk) - 1:00
Recorded at the 1st Independent Festival of Massy, October 24, 1975

Personnel
Archie Shepp - tenor saxophone
Charles Greenlee - trombone
Dave Burrell - piano
Cameron Brown - bass
Beaver Harris - drums

References

1976 live albums
Archie Shepp live albums